Phi Lambda Chi, commonly known as Phi Lamb, is a social collegiate fraternity founded at the Arkansas State Teachers College (now the University of Central Arkansas) in 1925. It was formerly a member of the North American Interfraternity Conference (NIC).

History
Phi Lambda Chi originated as the Lamb Society, a social fraternal organization formed in 1920 for high school boys. After the majority of its members had graduated from high school and enrolled in college, the Lamb Society decided to discontinue the group and form a new collegiate secret society.

Nine members of the Lamb Society and three new recruits organized Aztec at the Arkansas State Teachers College (now the University of Central Arkansas) on March 15, 1925. Aztec's founding members were Thomas Lester Adair, Robert B. Clark, Grant H. Collar, Wendell H. Collums, Marvin Crittenden, Evan M. Douglas, William E. Huddleston, J. Louis Moles, Doyle L. Patton, B. Howard Perrin, Jeff D. Shemwell, and Robert L. Taylor.

Aztec changed its name to Phi Lambda Chi in 1930 after the college began allowing local Greek letter organizations. By 1934 when the college began to allow national fraternities, the Phi Lambda Chi/Aztec had more than 300 alumni. Phi Lambda Chi voted to nationalize and elected a provisional Grand Council on January 19, 1939. The council was tasked with developing a national fraternity consisting of at least three chapters that would qualify for membership in the Association of Teachers College Fraternities.  

The council created a provisional constitution and voted to charter the local Phi Lambda Chi fraternity as the Alpha chapter of the national fraternity. The fraternity was established for students from regional and teaching colleges. The Beta chapter was added at Northeastern State University in 1939, followed by the Gamma chapter at the University of Arkansas at Monticello in 1940. 

Phi Lambda Chi held its first conclave from March 15 to 16, 1940, at the Arkansas State Teachers College. At this meeting, members approved a permanent constitution. Later, the fraternity expanded from its original teacher mission, opening its membership to students from any college or university in the United. States.

The Aztec, the fraternity's  magazine, honors its founding local organization. Its national philanthropy is the Arkansas Children's Hospital. In addition, chapters are required to partner with local charities to complete fifteen service hours per member.

Symbols
The fraternity's colors are blue and gold. Its flower is the white carnation and its mascot lion. Its motto is "Ever Onward." The Phi Lambda Phi coat of arms features "two vicious lions poised on either side against a shield, which has at its upper extremity a Grecian helmet and, at its lower extremity, a scroll bearing the Greek name of the Fraternity. Diagonally across the shield is a solid bar separating the eye in the upper right-hand comer from the crossed sabers in the lower left-hand comer."

The fraternity's Order of the Scroll or new member pin is a blue shield with a central gold disc. Its badge is worn by fully initiated members, called the Order of the Shield, and features a blue background decorated with gold symbols and a gold border. There is also a badge for alumni or Order of the Lion members which is similar to the badge, except for a border of pearls.

Chapters of Phi Lambda Chi 
Active chapters noted in bold, inactive chapter noted in italics.:

Notes

Notable alumni

Bill John Baker – chief of the Cherokee Nation
Cliff Hoofman –  justice of the Arkansas Supreme Court 
Jim Ross –  professional wrestling commentator

See also
List of social fraternities and sororities

References

Student organizations established in 1920
North American Interfraternity Conference
Student societies in the United States
1920 establishments in Arkansas